Amanza is a South Korean streaming television series starring Ji Soo, Lee Seol, Oh Hyun-kyung, Yoo Seung-mok and Lee Jong-won. Based on the Lezhin webtoon of the same name by Kim Bo-tong, it was released through KakaoTV from September 1 to November 3, 2020.

Synopsis
When 27-year-old Park Dong-myung is diagnosed with terminal cancer, he starts going back and forth between reality and the dream world where an exciting adventure unfolds during which he learns the meaning of life.

Cast

Main
 Ji Soo as Park Dong-myung / Amanza
 Lee Seol as Min-jung
 Oh Hyun-kyung as Mum
 Yoo Seung-mok as Dong Myung's father
 Lee Jong-won as Park Dong-yeon

Supporting
 Kang On as Kim Kang-on
 Shin Joo-hwan as Tae-hwan
 Choi Byung-yoon as Yong-min
 Park Hyung-soo as Hyung-joo
 Park Se-joon as Chul-gyu
 Kim Ye-eun as Ji-sun

Episodes

Production
The first script reading took place in the summer of 2020.

Original soundtrack

Part 1

Part 2

References

External links
  
 
 

KakaoTV original programming
South Korean drama web series
2020 web series debuts
2020 web series endings
Television series about cancer
Television shows based on South Korean webtoons